Markus Oberleitner (born 16 August 1973 in Munich) is a former football midfielder who played for SpVgg Unterhaching, Fortuna Düsseldorf and SpVgg Greuther Fürth in Germany and finished his career with FC Kärnten in Austria.

Career 
Oberleitner played as a youth for TSV Ottobrunn and TSV Brunnthal. In 1994, he signed for the then Regionalliga Süd (III) team SpVgg Unterhaching, achieving promotion to the 2. Bundesliga in his first season. In the 1995–96 season, he made 24 appearances in the second tier, scoring nine goals. The club finished in a respectable fourth place. He subsequently joined neighbours Bayern Munich. 

He remained a backup player at FC Bayern, however, and didn't make a single first-team appearance, before joining Fortuna Düsseldorf during the winter-break. Here he made his Bundesliga debut, but the club were relegated, and he returned to Unterhaching at the end of the season.

In 1999, Unterhaching were promoted to the Bundesliga for the first time in their history, and for their two years at this level, Oberleitner was a key first-team player. He made 63 appearances, scoring six goals, most famously a header in a 2–0 win over Bayer Leverkusen – a result that handed the league title to his former club, Bayern Munich.

After Unterhaching's relegation in 2001, Oberleitner joined SpVgg Greuther Fürth, of the 2. Bundesliga, but only made two first-team appearances. After a year, he moved to Austria, joining FC Kärnten. He retired from the game in 2003.

References

External links
 

1973 births
Living people
German footballers
Association football midfielders
SpVgg Unterhaching players
Fortuna Düsseldorf players
FC Bayern Munich footballers
SpVgg Greuther Fürth players
FC Kärnten players
Bundesliga players
2. Bundesliga players
Footballers from Munich